Rostov is a town in Yaroslavl Oblast, Russia, one of the oldest in the country and a tourist center of the Golden Ring. Population: 

While the official name of the town is Rostov, it is popularly known to Russians as Rostov Veliky (Rostov the Great) to distinguish it from the much larger city of Rostov-on-Don. The name of the town railway station is Rostov Yaroslavsky, due to its location in Yaroslavl Oblast.

History
Rostov was preceded by Sarskoye Gorodishche, which some scholars interpret as the capital of the Finnic Merya tribe. Others believe it was an important Viking trade enclave and fortress guarding the Volga trade route. It is known from Norse sources as Raðstofa. Scythians also settled there. These different ethnicities, such as the Vikings, Scyths, Slavs and Finns, were likely the ancestors of many of today's people in that region. First mentioned in documents in the year 862 as an already important settlement, by the 10th century Rostov became the capital city of Vladimir-Suzdal, one of the most prominent Rus principalities. It was incorporated into Muscovy in 1474.

After losing its independent status, Rostov was still an ecclesiastic center – from 988 it was the see of the Diocese of Yaroslavl, one of the first Russian bishoprics. In the 14th century, the bishops of Rostov became archbishops, and late in the 16th century, metropolitans. One of those metropolitans, Iona (Jonah) Sysoyevich (ca. 1607–1690), commissioned the town's main landmark: the kremlin. This is regarded by some as the finest outside that of Moscow.

Ravaged by the Mongols in the 13th and 14th centuries (last sack by Edigu in 1408), and the Poles in 1608, Rostov survived as a medium-sized town. Late in the 18th century, the metropolitan see was transferred to Yaroslavl.

Rostov is renowned for manufacturing enamels.

On August 24, 1953, the town was hit by an F3 tornado, causing severe damage. The tornado traveled 6 kilometers with a max width up to 550 meters.

Administrative and municipal status
Within the framework of administrative divisions, Rostov serves as the administrative center of Rostovsky District, even though it is not a part of it. As an administrative division, it is incorporated separately as the town of oblast significance of Rostov—an administrative unit with the status equal to that of the districts. As a municipal division, the town of oblast significance of Rostov is incorporated within Rostovsky Municipal District as Rostov Urban Settlement.

Main sights
 The architecture of the city shows many examples of early Russian Orthodox architecture. The central square of Rostov is occupied by the Assumption Cathedral. It is unknown when the present building was erected, the mid-16th century being the most likely date. Lower parts of the cathedral walls are dated to the 12th century. The ponderous bell-tower was constructed mostly in the 17th century. Its bells are among the largest and most famous in Russia - each has its own name. The largest bell, cast in 1688, weighs . It is named Sysoy to honor the city's founding father. The church is home to the incorrupt body of Saint Leontius of Rostov.

An area situated between the cathedral square and the lake was chosen by Iona Sysoevich as a place for his fairy-tale residence. All the construction works were carried out between 1667 and 1694. Major buildings include the ornate Savior Church-na-Senyakh (1675), the sombre Church of St. Gregory (1670), and the barbican churches of St. John the Apostle (1683) and of the Resurrection of Christ (1670). The residence, often erroneously called kremlin, also includes eleven ornate tower bells, numerous palaces, several small belfries, and the diminutive baroque Church of Our Lady of Smolensk (1693). All the churches are elaborately painted and decorated.

The cathedral and four tall kremlin churches with their silver "blind" domes were imitated throughout the city. This is particularly evident in the Savior-on-the-Market church and the cathedral church of the Nativity convent, both dating from the 17th century and situated near the kremlin walls. The oldest church within the town center was consecrated to St. Isidore the Blessed in 1565. They say that Ivan the Terrible had the architect executed, because his church was so much smaller than its predecessor.

The kremlin is flanked by two monasteries, both facing the Lake Nero. To the right from the kremlin stands the Abraham monastery, founded in the 11th century and one of the oldest in Russia. Its cathedral, commissioned by Ivan the Terrible in 1553 to commemorate the conquest of Kazan, inspired numerous churches in the region, particularly in Yaroslavl.

Spaso-Yakovlevsky Monastery, situated to the left from the Kremlin on the town's outskirts, has been venerated as the shrine of St. Dmitry of Rostov. Most of the monastery structures were built in the late 18th and early 19th centuries in the fine neoclassical style. There are also two 17th-century churches: the Conception of St. Anna, and the Transfiguration of Our Savior. Unlike most other churches in the town, the monastery belongs to the Russian Orthodoxy and houses a theological seminary.

Surroundings
The vicinity of Rostov is rich in old architecture. For example, an old wooden church (1687–1689) may be seen in Ishnya. The monastery was favored by Ivan the Terrible, who personally supervised the construction of towered walls and bell-tower around an even more ancient cathedral. The only addition made to the monastery after Ivan's death is a barbican church, commissioned by the metropolitan Iona Sysoyevich.

Twin towns/sister cities
  Jämsä, Finland
  Stevens Point, Wisconsin, USA

Rostov in films
 Peter I (1937), by Vladimir Petov
 Ivan Vasilievich: Back to the Future (Ivan Vasilievich Changes His Profession) (1973), by Leonid Gaidai

Notable people 
 Dmitry Borisovich (1253–1294), Russian nobleman
 Konstantin of Rostov (1186–1218), the eldest son of Vsevolod the Big Nest and Maria Shvarnovna
 Vasilko Konstantinovich (1209–1238), the first Prince of Rostov
Olena Kryvytska (born 1987), Ukrainian fencer
 Lev Naumov (1925–2005), Russian classical pianist, composer and educator
 Vera Weizmann (1881–1966), wife of Chaim Weizmann, medical doctor and the first president of the State of Israel
 Yuri Alexandrovich Bilibin (1901—1952), geologist
 Vera Dmitrievna Titova (1888–?), Russian scientist and educator

References

Notes

Sources

Further reading
 

Website of Rostov Kremlin==External links==
Landmarks of Rostov 
More landmarks of Rostov 
The Monastery of Sts Boris and Gleb 
Interior view of the Rostov Kremlin
Moonlight view of the Yakovlevsky Monastery from the Lake Nero
The orthodox newspaper of Rostov Veliky 
Rostov the Great

Cities and towns in Yaroslavl Oblast
Rostovsky Uyezd (Yaroslavl Governorate)
Golden Ring of Russia
World Heritage Tentative List